Haplogroup G2b-M377 is a Y-chromosome haplogroup and is defined by the presence of the M377 mutation.  It is a branch of Haplogroup G2, which in turn is defined by the presence of the M201 mutation.

G2b is a major Y chromosome haplogroup, and yet unique. It was found among Pashtuns, who are classified as Iranic and on much lower scale among all major Jewish groups, Palestinians, Lebanese and Syrians(See also page covering Jews with Haplogroup G (Y-DNA))  G2b presents more mysteries regarding its origin and distribution than virtually any other major Y haplogroup. Haplogroups that are rare in certain regions are more common in another, and have rather clear origins in other places where they are more commonly found. G2b has none of these obvious characteristics. Until the Second World War it was most common by far in Eastern Europe, a region where it arrived comparatively recently, but rare in other regions; including its likely area of origin. The distribution of G2b is sparse and dispersed, with almost no G2b haplotypes found in very large intervening regions. This pattern appears to be unique among Y haplogroups.

The extreme rarity of G2b in northern Pakistan could indicate that G2b in this area originates outside the region and was brought there in the historic period, perhaps from further west (Pakistan was part of both the  Achaemenid Persian Empire, conquered by Alexander the Great, and then formed a part of the Greco-Bactrian Kingdom). These two reported Pakistani G2b haplotypes are quite divergent from the Ashkenazi Jewish clade, and therefore do not at all indicate a recent common origin. The Turkish G2b is somewhat closer, but not identical. It remains to be seen if testing will reveal G2b haplotypes in other populations — this is some indication that G2b occurs at low levels in the Near East.  All G2b men tested so far have a rare null value for the DYS425 marker, (a missing "T" allele of the DYS371 palindromic STR), the result of a RecLOH event, a finding not yet seen among most other G haplotypes.  Among Jews in Israel drawn from many areas of the world, G2b constituted 3.7% in one study.

Phylogenetic position 

Extensive single nucleotide polymorphism (SNP) testing by the Haplogroup G SNP project found that G2b is an independent branch of haplogroup G characterized by only one SNP, M377. A forthcoming study by the Y Chromosome Consortium at the University of Arizona found that within haplogroup G, G2b and G2 share an SNP, P287, which is not found in the other well-attested branch of G, haplogroup G1.

Haplogroup characteristics

Distinguishing Y-STR alleles 
For the full listing of all the G2b Y-STR modal haplotype values, see the entry: HRGEN in ySearch.org

All G2b samples tested so far have a null value for the DYS425 marker, (a missing "T" allele of the DYS371 palindromic Y-STR, the result of a RecLOH event. This change is extremely uncommon in the rest of haplogroup G, but apparently happened early in the history of G2b.

* In haplogroup G2b, according to the Kittler Protocol for DYS385 which tests for the actual order of the DYS385 alleles along the Y chromosome, the smaller allele precedes the larger and therefore the allele sequence given here is physically correct.

Primer sequence

Distribution

Ashkenazi Jews 
A cluster of closely related Ashkenazi Jews represent virtually all confirmed G2b persons worldwide, both from private testing, and from academic studies. Of 211 known European G2bs, 8 are known to have non-Jewish patrilineal ancestors. G2b makes up about 7% of all Ashkenazi Jewish Y chromosome haplotypes, as was found in Behar et al. (2004) (n=442, GxG2=33). In the supplemental data from Behar et al. (2004), among the Ashkenazi Jewish G haplotypes haplotypes 4 and 6-15 are G2b, 2,3,5 are G1, and the haplogroup of the first listed is unclear. A much smaller group of Ashkenazi Jews however are in haplogroup G1, so not all GxG2 Ashkenazi Jews in the above study would be G2b. In a sample of 955 haplogroup G haplotypes, there are 103 Ashkenazi G2bs and 14 Ashkenazi G1s.  The ratio of G2b:G1 among Ashkenazi Jews is approximately 10:1.
 European G2b comparative haplotype table
European G2b unique haplotypes
 G2c SMGF.org haplotype search

Eastern Europe 
The distribution of G2b in Eastern Europe very closely reflects the 16th and 17th century settlement patterns of Ashkenazi Jews in the Polish-Lithuanian Commonwealth:

Western Germany 
G2b is also found among Ashkenazi Jews from Western Germany. Jews were not allowed to reside in most parts of Germany in the 16th and 17th centuries, aside from the Frankfurt Jewish Ghetto. Jews were expelled in 1670 from Vienna and the Archduchy of Austria. After Khmelnytsky's Pogrom in Poland in 1648, there began a migration of Jews from Poland and Lithuania to Western Germany, which accelerated and continued into the 19th century. A significant number of German Jewish G2bs appear to represent a pre-1640s independent settlement; some however may be the result of a migration from Eastern Europe.

Sicily 
Among Europeans, there are a few significant exceptions to this almost exclusive Ashkenazi Jewish distribution - out of the more than 2,000 known European G2bs, there are 4 Sicilians, including 3 members of one family with a tradition of Jewish patrilineal descent from the 16th century Sicily.

Southwest Syria 
It appears as if there are a few individuals of Syrian descent that also share this haplogroup. However, their split from the rest of the group should be a minimum of 2,000 years with further testing. It appears as if this group will fall into the G2b2 group and not the G2b1 group with the Pashtuns.

Eastern Anatolia 
A confirmed G2b Y-STR haplotype found in the literature is haplotype 54 from a study of Anatolian Y chromosomes (n=523) by  Cinnioglu et al. (2004) which was found in Eastern Turkey, in the city of Kars, very close to Armenia.

Afghanistan 
Haplogroup G2b has been found at a frequency of 60% out of a sample of 5 Pashtuns in the Wardak region of Afghanistan. This is likely due to a local founder effect .

Another study has found that Haplogroup G2c-M377 reaches 14.7% in Afghan Pashtuns from Baghlan (5/34), 7.5% in Pashtuns from Kunduz (4/53), 2.7% in Tajiks from Badakhshan (1/37) and 3.7% in Tajiks from Balkh (2/54).

Iran 
Haplogroup G2b was found in 1.6% (1/63) of Azerbaijanis from West Azerbaijan province in Iran in a 2012 study.

The Hindu Kush and Kashmir (Pakistan) 
There are just two other confirmed G2b samples that have been publicly reported in the academic literature so far, one Pashtun in the Khyber Pakhtunkhwa province of Pakistan (the  Hindu Kush Range), and one Burusho in the Hunza Valley in Kashmir. These two G2bs are Y-STR haplotypes 731 and 794 from Table 3 in the study by Sengupta et al. (2006) of Indian (n=728), Pakistani (n=176), and East Asian (n=175) Y chromosome lineages. Firasat et al. (2007) found 1 G among 97 Burushos, and in Sengupta et al. (2006) the only Burusho G was G2b, making it likely that this single G is G2b as well. The Y Chromosome Haplotype Reference Database has several haplotypes from India and Pakistan that are very likely to be G2b .

Historical background of the Ani region 
In 894 CE, the Bagratid Prince Ashot I was given the title of King of Armenia by the Abbasid Caliphate  and briefly established his capital at the ancient Armenian center of Bagaran 40 km south of Ani, and then moved it to Shirakavan, 15 km northeast of Ani. In 929 the capital was transferred to Kars, 42 km west of Ani, and then in 969 to Ani itself. Ani in the 10th and 11th centuries had a population as high as 100,000 - 200,000. The city continued to flourish even after the capture of Ani in 1064 by the Seljuks under Alp Arslan, and the subsequent rule by the Kurdish Muslim Shaddadid dynasty from 1072-1199. In 1199 Ani was captured by the forces of Queen Tamar of Georgia and a Georgian vassal kingdom was created which was ruled by the Zakarid dynasty. In 1236, the Mongols captured Ani, killing many of its inhabitants, but afterward it was continued to be ruled by the Georgian Zakarids. After its capture by the Turkic Kara Koyunlu in the 1330s, Ani declined rapidly. The Kara Koyunlu moved their capital to Yerevan in 1446 and by the 18th century Ani had been completely abandoned.

There is no evidence that Ani or the adjacent areas ever had a Jewish population in the Medieval period. There may have been an early presence of Jews in the Kingdom of Armenia in late Hellenistic and Roman times before the conversion of Armenia to Christianity, However, the possible presence of G2b almost exclusively in the region of the Medieval capitals of Armenia, Bagaran, Shirakavan, Kars, and Ani would indicate that, if indeed these haplotypes are G2b, it appeared in Armenia no earlier than 802 CE and no later than the mid-14th century.

Other predicted G2b Jewish haplotypes 

Two possible G2b Y-STR haplotype samples in the literature are from the study of Jewish and non-Jewish Near Eastern Y chromosomes by Nebel et al. (2001) (in the Appendix Table A1), haplotype 51 which was found in 1 Ashkenazi Jew (n=79) and 3 Kurdish Jews (n=99), and haplotype 47 which was found in 1 Iraqi Jew (combined Iraqi Jews n=20 and Syrian Jews n=3). However, recently advancements in haplogroup prediction have determined these haplotypes G2b. These also belong to what was termed at the time "Haplogroup 2", (F*, G, and I) and within this set of haplogroups these display a Y-STR allele pattern unique to haplogroup G2b. In this study, G2b was found among 3% of Kurdish Jews.
However, as with the Armenians, there are some G2 haplotypes that appear similar to G2b at these 6 STRs, but not at DYS389.

Upcoming studies 

Other Y chromosome samples taken from an upcoming study of Sephardi and Near Eastern (Mizrahi) Jews have found only a few GxG2 (in Y chromosome haplogroup G but not in G2) samples. Preliminary indications are that in this study, only a single Turkish Jew matches any of the modal haplotypes for G2b, however, all of these samples are being tested for M377/G2b.

The Kurdish and Iraqi Jewish samples from Nebel et al. (2002) are also being tested for M377/G2b by a different group for another study. Y chromosome haplogroup G1 is also found among Jewish populations, but it is likely that some of these samples will turn out to be in haplogroup G2b.

Comparison of regional haplotypes

Time to the Most Recent Common Ancestor (tMRCA) 
The time to the Most Recent Common Ancestor (tMRCA) for European G2b, derived by generating a median-joining network of over 25 haplotypes with 67 Y-STRs, yields a date of 955 years from the average birth year of the testees (estimated to be 1950), with a standard deviation of 107 years. The mutation rate used is based on that of family groups with known most recent common ancestors. So far, this tMRCA includes all groups of European G2bs, including it seems from preliminary evidence, the Italians.

This late tMRCA date for all of G2b in Europe raises the question of when G2b first entered Europe. If G2b entered Europe at an earlier period, we would expect to see more divergent haplotypes than we currently see. The very unusual highly ethnically-specific distribution of G2b in Europe combined with the very late tMRCA raises the question of from where G2b could have entered Europe.
Also, was the spread of G2b in Europe from the Kingdom of Poland to Germany and Italy, from German to Italy and Poland, or Italy northward to both other areas? No one particular region seems to be more divergent than any other, and in fact, there doesn't seem to be any geographically correlated subclades within European G2b, with samples from each region matching some from other regions more closely than ones from the same region.

Possible history 

One very early G2b sample, although it was derived as a negative for the SNP M377, was found in the remains of an individual dating back to 7000 BCE at Wezmeh Cave, a site near Eslamabad-e Gharb in the Kermanshah province in western Iran. Specifically, it belonged to G-Y37100.

Sicily 

It is estimated that Jews made up 6% or more of the population of Sicily in 1492. Historical evidence shows that most Sicilian Jews went eastward to the Ottoman Empire, where Sicilian Jewish congregations existed in Salonika and Constantinople until the late 19th century. However, it is known that many Sicilian Jews first went to Calabria, and then Jews were expelled from Calabria in 1524, and later from the entire Kingdom of Naples in 1540. There was a gradual movement throughout the 16th century of Jews in Italy from south to north, with conditions worsening for Jews in Rome after 1556 and Venice in the 1580s. Many Jews from Venice and the surrounding area migrated to Poland and Lithuania at this time.

In this scenario it may be that there was a direct migration from Sicily or Southern Italy separately to both Western Germany and Poland-Lithuania, but the presence of G2b in Germany may be due to an earlier migration from France or Spain; as the presence of G2b2 ancestors in Germany appears to date from at least the early 1500s.

Jews had lived in Sicily since Roman times. After the Byzantine reconquest of Sicily from the Arian Ostrogoths who were very tolerant of the Jews in 552, conditions worsened dramatically for Jews in Sicily. Under the Byzantine Empire few Jews lived in Sicily because of official persecution. Before 606 the bishop of Palermo ordered the synagogue to be converted into a church. An edict issued by Leo III the Isaurian in 722 which ordered the baptism by force of all Jews in the Empire. After the Muslim conquest of Sicily in 831-902, large numbers of Jews settled on the island. In 972, the Arab merchant Ibn Hawqal mentioned a Jewish Quarter in Palermo, and by 1170, Benjamin of Tudela reported 1500 Jewish households in Palermo and 200 in Messina. In 1149, Roger II forcibly brought the Jewish brocade, damask, and silk weavers of Thebes in Greece to Sicily to establish a silk industry there. This is an example of a late entry into Sicily of non-Iberian, non-Provençal Jews from outside of Western and Central Europe, from a region that has been poorly tested or devoid of Jews in modern times.

The preliminary conclusions from this evidence is that haplogroup G2b is not native to Europe. The very late tMRCA, and the very high ethnic specificity indicate a rather brief presence in Europe, but one that participated in the exponential growth of the Ashkenazi Jewish population in Eastern and Central Europe after the Black Death. The complete lack of G2b in Iberia and also so far among Spanish Jews indicates that G2b didn't come from Spain, or France, since some Spanish Jewish families originated in southern France and migrated to Spain after France expelled the Jews in 1306. This, along with the other evidence, leaves Sicily as the European origin of G2b. We know that Greek and Mizrahi Jews arrived in Sicily as late as 1149, and that primarily most Sicilian Jews settled there during the Arab Emirate of Sicily. This is one way of explaining the very late presence of G2b in Europe, the likely presence of G2b among at least Kurdish Jews, if not other Mizrahi Jews as well.

The East - the Pathans and the Burushos 

The presence of G2b in these areas may be accounted for by several separate theories, each with their own time scale. It does seem very likely that G2b originated in the Near East, in Anatolia or Syria, and spread both eastward and westward from there.

One often stated idea is of a direct Israelite ancestry for the Pashtuns as a whole. These stories were disseminated in Medieval times for religious reasons, and as part of the competition between the Mughals and the Pashtuns. However, this does not negate a possible Medieval Jewish origin for some of the Pashtun sub-tribes, but this would depend on the frequency of G2b among the Pashtuns, since any Jewish genetic admixture in relatively recent times would have been limited in scope.

The Silk Road 

The rarity of G2b in northeast Pakistan could indicate that G2b in this area originates outside the region and was brought there in the historic period from further west (this area was part of both the  Achaemenid Persian Empire, conquered by Alexander the Great, and then formed a part of the Greco-Bactrian Kingdom). These two reported G2b haplotypes seem to be quite divergent from both the Ashkenazi Jewish clade and the lone northeastern Anatolian G2b based on only 10 Y-STRs, and therefore may not indicate a recent common origin. Another possible route which brought G2b to this region is through trade, because Hunza is a fertile valley that was a major stopping point along the southern Silk Road just before the Khunjerab Pass into China.

A Northern Near Eastern / South Caucasian origin for G2b is much more likely. The Turkish G2b haplotype, and 5 of 6 other almost certain G2b Armenian haplotypes have ancestors from a small region in Kars Province of Turkey near the Medieval capitals of Armenia. The rarity of G2b, which is limited to this small area which only became important after the year 884 is most likely due to G2b arriving in the region after this time.

Again, the Jewish areas of Kurdistan were not far from this same region. Haplogroup G has its greatest diversity in this same area, where all recorded sub-haplogroups of G have been found, so the evidence seems to point to this region of Eastern Anatolia or south of the Caucasus as the area of origin for all of haplogroup G as well. G2b could have spread from this region eastward toward the Hindu Kush and the Karakorum ranges, and southward among the Judeans, and then subsequently westward with the Jewish Diaspora to Italy and then Central and Eastern Europe.

Famous people in haplogroup G2b 
John G. Cramer (born 1934)
Physicist and author.
 James Franciscus (1934–1991)
Leading American film and television actor.
 Newton Minow (born 1926)
Former Chairman of the United States Federal Communications Commission (FCC) and Chairman of the Public Broadcasting Service (PBS).

See also 
Haplogroup G (Y-DNA)
Haplogroup G (Y-DNA) Country by Country
haplotype
Y-STR
archaeogenetics
genetic genealogy

References

External links

Sites 
Family Tree DNA Haplogroup G2b Project
Haplogroup G SNP project
Categories and Data for Haplogroup G

Maps 
 Map of G
 Spread of Haplogroup G, from National Geographic
 The 2012 ISOGG Y haplogroup tree

Mailing Lists 
 Haplogroup G2b discussion group
 Haplogroup G Yahoo Group
 Rootsweb Haplogroup G Mailing List
 Family Tree DNA's Haplogroup G2b Project
 FamilyTreeDNA's Haplogroup G Project

G2b
Ashkenazi Jews topics